Arthur L. Zimny was a member of the Wisconsin State Senate.

Biography
Zimny was born on August 5, 1900, in Milwaukee, Wisconsin. After graduating from South Division High School, Zimny took part in the University of Wisconsin-Extension program. He was a member of the Polish Roman Catholic Union of America and the Knights of Columbus. Zimny died in 1973.

Career
Zimny was a member of the Senate from 1935 to 1942. He was a Democrat.

References

See also
The Political Graveyard

Politicians from Milwaukee
Democratic Party Wisconsin state senators
Catholics from Wisconsin
1900 births
1973 deaths
20th-century American politicians
South Division High School alumni